Gulnara Mehmandarova (born in 1959) is an architect, researcher (historian of architecture and art) and Corresponding Member of the International Academy of Architecture of Oriental  Countries.  Gulnara Kamal Mehmandarova has a PhD in theory and history of architecture and restoration of architectural monuments. She has published more than 70 scientific publications.

Work with World Heritage Sites, UNESCO

World Heritage List (WHL), UNESCO
Gulnara Mehmandarova has prepared the documentation for the proposed inclusion of several architectural monuments in Azerbaijan onto the List of World Heritage Sites, including the Walled City of Baku  with the  Shirvanshah's Palace  and Maiden Tower (declared a UNESCO World Heritage Site in 2000), and the Fire Temple "Ateshgah" in Surakhany

Work with International Council on Monuments and Sites (ICOMOS)
 ICOMOS-CIVVIH — member of The International Scientific Committee on Historic Towns and Villages of ICOMOS
 ICOMOS-IWC — member of The International Scientific Wood Committee of ICOMOS
 President of Azerbaijan Committee of International Council on Monuments and Sites (ICOMOS)

Memberships in the Unions of Architects
 National Association of Norwegian Architects
 Society for the Preservation of Ancient Norwegian Monuments
 International Academy of Architecture of Oriental Countries
 Union of Architects of Azerbaijan
 Union of Architects of USSR — Soviet Union

See also
Mammadbeyov, noble family of Azerbaijan
Mgeladze, noble family of Georgia
Ashurbeyov, noble family of Azerbaijan
Mehmandarov, noble family of Azerbaijan

References

20th-century Azerbaijani architects
21st-century Azerbaijani architects
20th-century Norwegian architects
21st-century Norwegian architects
Azerbaijani women architects
Azerbaijani academics
Azerbaijani women academics
Azerbaijani architectural historians
Azerbaijani women scientists
Norwegian academics
Norwegian women academics
Living people
1959 births
Women historians